Cazzette is a Swedish electronic dance music duo, founded in 2011 by musicians Alexander Björklund and Sebastian Furrer.

Biography
The duo is best known for the songs "Beam Me Up", from their debut album Eject (2014), and "Sleepless" (2014), which charted in Sweden. They have also performed with Swedish progressive house DJ Avicii at a live show in New York City, on 27 September 2012 and again with Avicii as the guest act in Manchester on 20 February 2014. Early in 2015, the duo's collaboration with Terri B!, a song entitled, "Blind Heart", peaked at number one on the US Dance chart. On 31 March 2015, Cazzette announced their EP Desserts, which was released on 14 August 2015 release. They also announced the first single of the EP, "Together", released on 29 May 2015.

in 2016 Furrer announced that he stops touring with the act, only focusing on the production side.

Discography

Albums

Extended plays

Singles

Promotional singles

Remixes

References

Musical groups established in 2011
Swedish electronic musicians
Swedish DJs
Electronic dance music DJs
Masked musicians